Muhammad Faisal bin Abdul Halim (born 7 January 1998) is a Malaysian professional footballer who plays as a forward for Malaysia Super League club Selangor and the Malaysia national team.

Club career

Penang

Faisal started his professional career with Penang's President Cup squad. He made his debut and scored one goal in the Malaysia Cup tournament against PDRM FA on 17 October 2015 where Penang lost 2–3.

He was one of the young players who were called up to play with Penang's senior team squad in preparation for the 2015 Malaysia Cup. His performance in the Malaysia President Cup competition brought him to the attention of Penang's management. He left Penang after the end of the season after making 3 appearances and scoring 1 goal.

Pahang
In November 2015, Faisal signed a contract with Pahang. He help Pahang FA won Malaysia FA Cup 2018

Terengganu
On the 6th of December 2020, Faisal Halim signed a contract with Terengganu and will be using the number 7 for the 2021 season. He scored his first goal against Perak in a 2–0 win at Ipoh Stadium.

Selangor
On 22 December 2022, it was announced that Faisal had joined Selangor on a free transfer.

International career

Faisal made his Malaysia national football team debut against Nepal in 2019. Faisal is also part of the Malaysian team that qualified for the 2023 AFC Asian Cup and scored 1 goal against Turkmenistan to win 3-1 in 2023 AFC Asian Cup qualification – Third Round.

Career statistics

Club

International

Honours

Club
Penang Reserves
Malaysia President Cup runner-up: 2015

Pahang
Malaysia FA Cup:  2018

Malaysia
King's Cup runner-up: 2022

Individual
AFF Championship Best XI: 2022

References

1998 births
Living people
Malaysian footballers
People from Penang
Malaysian people of Malay descent
Penang F.C. players
Sri Pahang FC players
Terengganu FC players
Malaysia Super League players
Association football forwards
Footballers at the 2018 Asian Games
Asian Games competitors for Malaysia
Competitors at the 2019 Southeast Asian Games
Malaysia international footballers
Malaysia youth international footballers
Southeast Asian Games competitors for Malaysia